Bradbury is a suburb of Sydney, in the state of New South Wales, Australia. Bradbury is located 54 kilometres south-west of the Sydney central business district, in the local government area of the City of Campbelltown and is part of the Macarthur region.

The suburb features many areas of greenery with native trees characterising most streets. Many streets are home to a range of native trees. Most of the street names in the suburb are after types of trees such as Bottlebrush Avenue, Jacaranda Avenue, Stringybark Place and Ash Place.

History
Bradbury was previously known as Sherwood Hills and is one of the more established suburbs of Campbelltown, with large-scale residential development beginning in the 1960s. It was named after William Bradbury, a local innkeeper in the 1820s and 30s. The area surrounding Manooka Reserve (beside The Parkway) was originally called Manooka Estate, but became part of Bradbury in the 1970s.

Bradbury is said to be the location where Fisher's ghost (Frederick Fisher) appeared on a bridge post, to indicate where his body lay. The name of the creek that runs through the suburb is called Fishers Ghost Creek.

People
According to the 2016 census of population, there were 8,800 residents in Bradbury. 
 Aboriginal and Torres Strait Islander people made up 4.5% of the population. 
 71.5% of people were born in Australia. The next most common countries of birth were England 3.6%, New Zealand 2.8% and Philippines 1.3%.   
 78.1% of people spoke only English at home. Other languages spoken at home included Arabic 3.3%, Samoan 1.4% and Spanish 1.3%. 
 The most common responses for religion were Catholic 26.4%, No Religion 21.5% and Anglican 19.5%.

Notable residents
 Samuel Rouen (born 1988) - Winner Of The Biggest Loser (Australia) 2008
Dean Hewson (born 1988); guitarist from the punk band Dinkibike. Notable tracks- Trainwreck (2011) and 25 to Life (2008).
Cherylyn Barnes (born Dec 4, 1955) ; YouTuber, Singer, and Internet Personality (active since 2013).

Sport and recreation
Bradbury features a swimming complex called Bradbury Pools - which includes one large outdoor Olympic sized swimming pool, a children's wading pool, and two indoor pools (one heated, and one regular). Also in the suburb are several ovals, which support the local Rugby League team- Campbelltown Collegians and cricket team- Bradbury for both matches and training.

Transport
Busabout runs a bus service through the area, chiefly with the route numbers 885 and 886.

References

External links
  [CC-By-SA]

Towns in the Macarthur (New South Wales)
Suburbs of Sydney
City of Campbelltown (New South Wales)